Amblyseius williamsi is a species of mite in the family Phytoseiidae.

References

williamsi
Articles created by Qbugbot
Animals described in 1983